SIDSPACE is a mnemonic used in remembering which Latin prepositions take the ablative case. 

SIDSPACE stands for the following prepositions: sub (during), in (at), de (about), sine (without), pro (before), ab (after), cum (with), and ex (from).  Although not all of these words take the ablative case in every context, all of them do take it some of the time. For example, 'in' takes the ablative case when expressing location, as in "He is in Italy," but takes the accusative case when it is expressing motion, such as "He went into Italy."

The mnemonic omits some of the less common prepositions, which are included in the rhyme:

A, ab, '', coram, de,palam, clam, cum, ex or e,sine, tenus, pro and prae.Sub, subter, super, in beside
when state not motion is implied.

A second version goes as follows:A, ab, absque, coram, de,palam, clam, cum, ex or e,sine, tenus, pro and praeGovern the ablative every day.
To these, if rest at is intended,In, sub, super, must be appended.

{Sub means under and super means above''.)

A third version is as follows:

A, ab, absque, coram, de, 
Palam, clam, cum, ex and e,
Sine, tenus, pro and prae  
Plus super, subter, sub and in 
When rest not motion 'tis you mean.

References

Latin declension
Latin grammar
Latin words and phrases
Grammatical cases
Acronyms
Mnemonics